Calamotropha obliterans is a moth in the family Crambidae. It was described by Francis Walker in 1863. It is found on Borneo.

References

Crambinae
Moths described in 1863